Portrait of Carrie is the fourth album by Carrie Lucas. Released in 1980 on the SOLAR Records label.

Track listing
"It's Not What You Got (It's How You Use It)"  6:26
"Lovin' Is on My Mind"  4:07
"Career Girl"  6:52
"Use It or Lose It"  4:44
"Fashion"  6:42
"Just a Memory"  5:54
"I Gotta Keep Dancin' (Keep Smiling) [12" Version]"  7:38

Album

Singles

References

1980 albums
SOLAR Records albums
Carrie Lucas albums
Albums produced by Leon Sylvers III